Łukasz Kubot and Oliver Marach were the defenders of title, but Kubot chose not to compete this year and Marach chose to play in Munich instead.
Santiago González and Travis Rettenmaier won in the final 7–6(8–6), 6–1, against Tomasz Bednarek and Mateusz Kowalczyk.

Seeds

Draw

Draw

References
 Main Draw

Serbia Open - Doubles
Serbia Open